Peel is a company based in Mountain View, California, USA, that sells a smartphone and tablet app providing universal remote functions compatible with many third-party smart devices and appliances.

Peel has partnered with cable and direct-to-home networks to give its users access to regional TV schedules of all the channels available to them. This lets users be aware of the TV shows and what is on TV at that moment.

The company’s patent-pending Peel-In technology allows users to tune in directly to a TV show or movie, record the show on their DVR, set up a calendar reminder or share with contacts by clicking a promotional banner.

History 

Peel Smart Remote was launched in 2009 by current CEO Thiru Arunachalam and co-founder Bala Krishnan, who serves as chief product officer. Peel built a user base of 25 million during its first few years of operation and then increased it to over 70 million in the subsequent year due to agreements with major device manufacturers Samsung and HTC to include Peel as a preloaded app. In 2015 Peel claimed that their app generated over 100 billion remote commands with over 120 million registered users.

Peel has raised more than 90 million dollars from investors.

Peel Smart Remote 
Peel allows users to turn smartphones or tablets into a smart remote control for televisions, set top boxes, digital video recorders (DVRs) and other devices. It also allows users to browse on the app for content to watch and learns viewing habits to enable the platform to deliver personalized recommendations. Users can interact with friends and other TV viewers via the app. The platform provides TV networks with a way to promote their programming to consumers, who can use the app to tune into shows, record programming or get viewing reminders.

Peel can be downloaded as an iOS or Android app. It is integrated with Samsung and HTC devices for delivery to device purchasers as a preloaded app. On Samsung devices it is called “WatchOn” or “Smart Remote.” On HTC it is called “SenseTV” or “TV.” As of August 2015 “WatchOn” and “Smart Remote” have been renamed to Peel Smart Remote. Peel completes an average of 30 billion remote control actions per month. The app works in over 200 countries and delivers program guides in 110 countries.

Peel Universal Smart Remote uses built-in IR hardware on Android smartphones to control devices by tapping the on-screen remote. For phones without the IR hardware, Peel uses WiFi to discover and control devices. One can connect to devices in the same WiFi network and control them from their phone.

In 2017, the Android app received criticism from users who complained about the app forcing an overlay onto their device's lock screen and ads being added to the app.

References

External links
 

American companies established in 2009
Companies based in Mountain View, California